Scolypopa is a genus of planthoppers in the family Ricaniidae. There are about eight described species in Scolypopa, found mainly in Australia and New Zealand.

Species
These eight species belong to the genus Scolypopa:
 Scolypopa aeneomicans Haupt, 1926
 Scolypopa aphrophoroides (Walker, 1862)
 Scolypopa australis (Walker, 1851) (passionvine hopper)
 Scolypopa confinis (Distant, 1906)
 Scolypopa delecta (Melichar, 1898)
 Scolypopa kurandae Kirkaldy, 1906
 Scolypopa scutata Stål, 1859
 Scolypopa stipata (Walker, 1851)

References

External links

 

Auchenorrhyncha